The 1988 Detroit Drive season was the first for the Drive.

Under head coach Tim Marcum, the Drive finished the regular season 9-3 after starting the season 2-3. Two of the Drive's losses came at the hands of the Chicago Bruisers, who finished the season with one loss. The Drive would get a chance at revenge when they advanced to ArenaBowl II against the Bruisers, and they were able to defeat the Bruisers 24-13.

Regular season

Schedule

Standings

Playoffs

Roster

Awards

References

External links
1988 Detroit Drive roster
1988 Detroit Drive

Detroit Drive Season, 1988
Detroit Drive
Massachusetts Marauders
ArenaBowl champion seasons